City Tower Nishi-Umeda (Japanese:シティタワー西梅田) is a high rise apartment building, situated at 7-20 Fukushima, Fukushima-ku, Osaka, Japan.

This building is the highest in Fukushima ward, and the highest apartment block in the Umeda area. The glass curtain wall facade, an external wall made with glass, is a notable characteristic of this building.

Access 

See also 
Osaka
List of tallest buildings in Osaka
The Symphony Hall  : neighboring concert hall

Fukushima-ku, Osaka
Residential skyscrapers in Japan
Skyscrapers in Osaka